Henney Motor Company was an American manufacturer of limousine, hearse, ambulance  taxicab bodies in Freeport, Illinois from 1927 to 1954. Some operations were moved to Canastota, New York to make an electric car, the Henney Kilowatt but the factory closed when partner National Union Electric Corp found it impossible to manufacture the batteries for the planned price.

See also

References

Luxury motor vehicle manufacturers
Coachbuilders of the United States
Defunct motor vehicle manufacturers of the United States
1927 establishments in Illinois
Manufacturing companies established in 1927
Manufacturing companies based in Illinois